Adam Segal (born September 29, 1968) is an American cybersecurity expert. He serves as the Ira A. Lipman Chair in Emerging Technologies and National Security and Director of the Digital and Cyberspace Policy Program at the Council on Foreign Relations. He is the author of three monographs on technology.

Early life
Adam Segal was born on September 29, 1968, attended Memphis University School, and graduated from Cornell University with a bachelor's degree in Government. He received a master's degree from Fletcher School of Law and Diplomacy at Tufts University. He returned to Cornell University, where he received a PhD in Government.

Career
Segal is a cybersecurity expert, as well as an expert on Chinese technology policy. He served as the Ira A. Lipman Chair in Emerging Technologies and National Security and Director of the Digital and Cyberspace Policy Program at the Council on Foreign Relations. Before working at the Council, he was a China analyst at the Union of Concerned Scientists. He has been a visiting scholar at the Hoover Institution, MIT's Center for International Studies, Shanghai Academy of Social Sciences, and Tsinghua University.

Segal is the author of three books. His first book, Digital Dragon: High-Technology Enterprises in China, was reviewed in Pacific Affairs by Eric Thun, The China Quarterly by Cong Cao, Leonardo by Stefaan Van Ryssen, Perspectives on Politics by Thomas G. Moore, The China Review by Mark Jacobs, The China Journal by Bennis Wai-yip So. Foreign Affairs by Lucian Pye, and Perspectives Chinoises by Gilles Guiheux. His second book, Advantage: How American Innovation Can Overcome the Asian Challenge, was reviewed in the Journal of International Affairs by Christopher Reim and Foreign Affairs by Andrew Nathan. His third book, Hacked World Order was reviewed by Gary Schmitt in The Wall Street Journal  and in Lawfare by Henry Farrel.

Works

References

1968 births
Living people
Cornell University alumni
The Fletcher School at Tufts University alumni
American non-fiction writers